Domnița may refer to:
Domnița, the former name of Mihail Kogălniceanu village in Râmnicelu, Brăila Commune, Brăila County, Romania
Domnița, a village in Țibana Commune, Iași County, Romania